Taphrosphys is an extinct genus of bothremydid pleurodiran turtle that was discovered Angola, Morocco and the United States. The genus consists of type species Platemys sulcatus (combinatio nova T. sulcatus), T. ippolitoi, T. congolensis, and the dubious T. dares.

Discovery 
The holotype of Taphrosphys was discovered in New Jersey.

References 

Bothremydidae
Prehistoric turtle genera
Late Cretaceous turtles
Maastrichtian life
Paleocene life
Cretaceous–Paleogene boundary
Fossils of the United States
Fossils of Angola
Fossils of Morocco
Cretaceous North America
Cretaceous Africa
Fossil taxa described in 1865
Taxa named by Edward Drinker Cope